David A. Andelman (born October 6, 1944, Cambridge, Massachusetts) is an American journalist, political commentator and author.

Biography
Born October 6, 1944 to a Jewish family in Cambridge, Massachusetts, the son of Selma (née Nathanson) and Saul Andelman. His father was an attorney. He is a graduate of Harvard College and of the Columbia University Graduate School of Journalism. Andelman was the editor of World Policy Journal from 2008 until 2015. Previously, he served as an executive editor at  Forbes.com, as business editor of New York Daily News, as a Washington correspondent for CNBC, and as a reporter, correspondent and bureau chief for The New York Times in covering Southeast Asia from his base in Bangkok, Eastern Europe from his base in Belgrade, and New York. Following The New York Times, he served for seven years as Paris correspondent for CBS News.

He is the author of A Shattered Peace: Versailles 1919 and the Price We Pay Today, a look at how some of the world's current geopolitical problems can be traced to the Treaty of Versailles which ended World War I. He was also co-author of The Fourth World War: Diplomacy and Espionage in the Age of Terrorism, a book of memoirs and opinion with Alexandre de Marenches, a former head of French intelligence.

He is a member of the Board of Contributors of USA Today and is a 'Voices' columnist for CNN, writing columns dealing with international affairs. He is also a member of the Council on Foreign Relations. From 2010 to 2012 he served as president of the Overseas Press Club.

In 2017, he was named a visiting scholar at the Center on National Security of Fordham Law School and director of The Red Lines Project.

Personal life
In 1974, he married Susan Sheinman. In 2000, he married Pamela Susan Title of New Orleans, Louisiana.

Books
 David A. Andelman, A Red Line in the Sand: Diplomacy, Strategy, and the History of Wars that Might Still Happen, Pegasus Books, 2021 
 Guillaume Serina, David A. Andelman (translator, afterword), An Impossible Dream: Reagan, Gorbachev, and a World Without the Bomb, Pegasus Books, 2019, 
 David A. Andelman, A Shattered Peace: Versailles 1919 and the Price We Pay Today, John Wiley Publishers, 2007, with a new (2015) Centennial Edition and foreword by Sir Harold Evans,  
 Alexandre De Marenches and David A. Andelman, The Fourth World War: Diplomacy and Espionage in the Age of Terrorism, William Morrow & Co, 1992, 
 David A. Andelman, The Peacemakers, Harper & Row Publishers, 1973,

References

External links
Profile, C-SPAN
Instagram

1944 births
Living people
Writers from Cambridge, Massachusetts
American political journalists
Jewish American journalists
American foreign policy writers
American male non-fiction writers
Harvard College alumni
Columbia University Graduate School of Journalism alumni
CNN people
21st-century American Jews